Malcolm Davis may refer to:

Malcolm Davis (ornithologist), American ornithologist
, British motocross rider

See also
Malcolm Davies, Welsh professional darts player